Damurchi (also Romanized as Damūrchī; also known as Damīrchī) is a village in Bayat Rural District, Nowbaran District, Saveh County, Markazi Province, Iran. At the 2006 census, its population was 128, in 51 families.

References 

Populated places in Saveh County